Guaya may refer to:

 Guayaguayare, a village in Trinidad and Tobago
 Melicoccus bijugatus, Sapindaceae, a Neotropical tree species